Words from the Exit Wound is the eighth studio album by British extreme metal band Napalm Death, released in 1998 by Earache. It was issued only on CD. It is considered the final album of the band's "experimental" period, while simultaneously foreshadowing the band's return to a more traditional death metal and grindcore sound.

Critical reception

Ian Christe of CMJ New Music Monthly praised the producer's work: "Richardson does an even more fantastic job than usual of presenting the musical subtlety and cleverness of compositions that could easily be lost behind an enormous wall of noise." About the singer he said: "Greenway assists more than usual, by stretching his voracious vocal scorch across a new range of tones."

Track listing

Personnel

Napalm Death
 Mark "Barney" Greenway – vocals
 Jesse Pintado – lead guitar
 Mitch Harris – rhythm guitar
 Shane Embury – bass
 Danny Herrera – drums

Technical personnel
 Colin Richardson – production
 Ewan Davies – assistant engineering
 Guy Davie – mastering
 Matt Cannon – photography
 Graham Humphreys – design

References

Napalm Death albums
1998 albums
Earache Records albums